Larch Mountain is a  summit in the Black Hills range of Thurston County, Washington state.

References

External links
 
 

Mountains of Thurston County, Washington
Mountains of Washington (state)